The Dublin Bay 24 footer yacht is a one-design wooden sailing boat designed for sailing in Dublin Bay.

It was designed in the mid-1930s, under a commission from a group of Dublin Bay owners, members of the Royal Alfred Yacht Club, yacht designer Alfred Mylne produced the largest one-design yacht in Europe.  The classic lines prompted one owner to declare it a ”six-metre with a proper amount of beam” and the sea-keeping qualities, particularly downwind in heavy conditions were much admired.  Although used now as dayboats, some of them have raced and cruised offshore in the past, including Fastnet Races, the Northwest coast of Norway & throughout Scotland.

Built at the Isle of Bute, their building was disturbed by the war so the first boat was not delivered until 1946.  Eventually eight hulls were constructed and seven of them raced for many years in Dublin Bay.

List of Boats and their sail numbers:
 Fenestra
 Vandra (lost)
 Euphanzel
 Zephyra
 Adastra
 Harmony
 Periwinkle
 Arandora

The original five were Euphanzel, Fenestra, Vandra, Zephra and Adastra. These were later joined by Harmony and Arandora. Periwinkle stayed in Scotland.

The class is now defunct, and none of the Dún Laoghaire berthed fleet remain. The last Dublin Bay Sailing Club Dublin Bay 24 Class race was held on 25 September 2004. The entire fleet are currently undergoing a refit in Benodet, Brittany, France. Once restored the fleet will be based at Villefranche-sur-Mer on the French Riviera.

External links
 Dublin Bay 24 Online
 Dublin Bay Sailing Club - Classes

References 

Keelboats